Colony Hill is a small neighborhood located in the southwest corner of Glover Archbold Park in Northwest Washington, D.C. It is bounded on the north and east by the park, on the south by Reservoir Road NW, and on the west by Foxhall Road NW. Colony Hill falls within Ward 3.

Colony Hill is purely residential, and consists of only five streets: Reservoir Road, Foxhall Road, Hoban Road, 45th Street NW, and Hadfield Lane. It belongs within the 20007 zip code.

Neighborhoods in Northwest (Washington, D.C.)